Paden may refer to:

Places in the United States
 Paden, Mississippi, a village in Tishomingo County, Mississippi
 Paden, Oklahoma, a town in Okfuskee County, Oklahoma
 Paden City, West Virginia, a city in West Virginia
 Paden City Elementary School
 Paden City High School
 Paden Island, an island in Wetzel County, West Virginia

Other uses
 Paden (surname)
 Paden's Drug Store, Carrizozo, New Mexico
 Paden, a character in the 1985 movie Silverado
 Paden, a clothing line created by Davey Havok